The App is an 2019 Italian drama directed by Elisa Fuksas, written by Elisa Fuksas and Lucio Pellegrini, and starring Vincenzo Crea, Jessica Cressy and Greta Scarano.

It was released on 26 December 2019 on Netflix.

Cast
 Vincenzo Crea as Niccolò
 Jessica Cressy as Eva
 Greta Scarano as Ofelia
 Maya Sansa as Maria
 Abel Ferrara as the film director
 Anita Kravos as Matilde
 Giampiero Judica as attorney Tommaso Trapani
 Romeo Pellegrini as John
 Stella Mastrantonio as Miriam
 Beatrice Puccilli as Molly

Release
The App was released by Netflix on December 26, 2019.

References

External links
 
 

2019 films
Italian-language Netflix original films
2010s Italian-language films
Italian drama films
2019 drama films